USS LST-39 was a United States Navy  used exclusively in the Asiatic-Pacific Theater during World War II. Like many of her class, she was not named and is properly referred to by her hull designation.

Construction 
LST-39 was laid down on 23 April 1943, at Pittsburgh, Pennsylvania by the Dravo Corporation; launched on 29 July 1943; sponsored by Mrs. L. A. Mertz; and commissioned on 8 September 1943.

Service history  
During World War II, LST-39 was assigned to the Asiatic-Pacific theater, but saw no combat action. She sank 21 May 1944, as part of the West Loch disaster and she was struck from the Navy list on 18 July 1944.

She was later refloated, converted to a spare parts issue barge, and redesignated YF-1079. In early October 1945, YF-1079 was in Buckner Bay, when typhoon Louise passed over. She was one of over 200 US military vessels to be grounded or severely damaged. During the storm she was struck by another ship, severely damaging her starboard side. She was again struck from the Navy list 25 February 1946, and destroyed August 1946.

See also 

 Landing craft
 List of United States Navy LSTs

References

Bibliography 

 
 

 

 

World War II amphibious warfare vessels of the United States
Ships built in Pittsburgh
1943 ships
LST-1-class tank landing ships of the United States Navy
Maritime incidents in May 1944
Maritime incidents in October 1945
Ships sunk by non-combat internal explosions
Ships built by Dravo Corporation